The Energy Policy Act of 1992, effective October 24, 1992, (102nd Congress H.R.776.ENR, abbreviated as EPACT92) is a United States government act. It was passed by Congress and set goals, created mandates, and amended utility laws to increase clean energy use and improve overall energy efficiency in the United States. The Act consists of twenty-seven titles detailing various measures designed to lessen the nation's dependence on imported energy, provide incentives for clean and renewable energy, and promote energy conservation in buildings.

Amendment of prior energy acts
It reformed the Public Utility Holding Company Act of 1935 (PUHCA) to help small utility companies stay competitive with larger utilities and amended the Public Utility Regulatory Policies Act (PURPA) of 1978, broadening the range of resource choices for utility companies and outlined new rate-making standards. It also amended parts of the Federal Power Act of 1935 (Title VII).

Titles
The act addressed:
energy efficiency, energy conservation and energy management (Title I),
natural gas imports and exports (Title II), 
alternative fuels and requiring certain fleets to acquire alternative fuel vehicles, which are capable of operating on nonpetroleum fuels (Title III-V), 
electric motor vehicles (Title VI), 
radioactive waste (Title VIII), 
coal power and clean coal (Title XIII), 
renewable energy (Title XII), 
and other issues.

Title I--energy efficiency
Title I established a comprehensive energy efficiency program that included incentives for energy conservation in buildings and created efficiency standards for appliances.

The EPAct directed the federal government to decrease energy consumption in federal buildings when feasible, and to integrate the use of alternative fuel vehicles in federal and state fleets. 
There are separate sections dedicated to coal, oil, natural gas, and nuclear energy detailing clean energy incentives, research & development strategies, conservation goals, and responsible management practices.

Energy efficiency provisions
Buildings - Requires states to establish minimum commercial building energy codes and to consider minimum residential codes based on current voluntary codes. This gave impetus to the creation and modification of ASHRAE 90.1/1999, 2001, ASHRAE 90.2, the Model Energy Code etc.
Utilities - Requires states to consider new regulatory standards that would require utilities to undertake integrated resource planning; allow the energy efficiency programs to be at least as profitable as new supply options; and encourage improvements in supply system efficiency.
Equipment Standards - Establishes efficiency standards for: Commercial heating and air-conditioning equipment; electric motors; and lamps.
Renewable Energy - Establishes a program for providing federal support on a competitive basis for renewable energy technologies
Alternative Fuels
Electric Vehicles
Electricity - Removes obstacles to wholesale power competition in the Public Utilities Holding Company Act (PUHCA).

Title III--alternative fuels 
Title III of the 1992 Energy Policy Act addresses alternative fuels. It gave the U.S. Department of Energy administrative power to regulate the minimum number of light duty alternative fuel vehicles required in certain federal fleets beginning in fiscal year 1993. Title III includes:

Federal Fleet Requirements.
State and Alternative Fuel Provider Rule.
Private and Local Government Fleet Rule.
Alternative Fuel Designation Authority.

Title VI--electric motor vehicles 
The United States Department of Energy, which has EPACT92 implementation authority, ruled that diesel-electric or gasoline-electric hybrids are not "alternative fuel vehicles."

Title VIII--radioactive waste
Section 801 directed the United States Environmental Protection Agency to promulgate radiation protection standards for the Yucca Mountain nuclear waste repository, which had been designated by the Federal government to serve as the permanent disposal site for used nuclear fuel and other radioactive materials from commercial nuclear power plants and U.S. Department of Defense activities.

Title XII--renewable energy
Title XXII in the EPAct authorized tax incentives and marketing strategies for renewable energy technologies in an effort to encourage commercial sales and production.

Title XX--reduction of oil vulnerability
Section 2026 known as Renewable Hydrogen Energy establishes a five year program in accordance with the Spark M. Matsunaga Hydrogen Research, Development, and Demonstration Act of 1990 for the distribution, production, storage, and utilization of hydrogen.

Impact
EPACT92 was far reaching in the impacting electric power deregulation, building codes and new energy efficient products.
The act was also responsible for the mandate of low flush toilets and outlawing the installation of toilets that flushed more than 1.6 gallons (6 liters) of water.

See also
United States Enrichment Corporation
Public Utility Holding Company Act of 1935
Public Utility Regulatory Policies Act of 1978

References

External links
 Thomas (Library of Congress) - Energy Policy Act (1992) 
 U.S. Department of Energy - Yucca Mountain Project site
 https://web.archive.org/web/20060901153306/http://ipl.unm.edu/cwl/fedbook/energypo.html

1992 in the environment
1992 in law
102nd United States Congress
United States federal energy legislation